The Seaboard Coast Line Railroad  was a Class I railroad company operating in the Southeastern United States beginning in 1967. Its passenger operations were taken over by Amtrak in 1971. Eventually, the railroad was merged with its affiliate lines to create the Seaboard System in 1983.

At the end of 1970, SCL operated 9,230 miles of railroad, not including A&WP-Clinchfield-CN&L-GM-Georgia-L&N-Carrollton; that year it reported 31,293 million ton-miles of revenue freight and 512 million passenger-miles.

History
 
The Seaboard Coast Line emerged on July 1, 1967, following the merger of the Seaboard Air Line Railroad with the Atlantic Coast Line Railroad. The combined system totaled , the eighth largest in the United States at the time. The railroad had $1.2 billion in assets and revenue with a 54% market share of rail service in the Southeast, facing competition primarily from the Southern. The seemingly redundant name resulted from the longstanding short-form names of these two major Southeastern railroads. For years, SAL had been popularly known as "Seaboard," while ACL was known as "the Coast Line."

Prior to the creation of Amtrak on May 1, 1971, the Seaboard Coast Line provided passenger service over much of its system, including local passenger trains on some lines. Local trains ended when the Amtrak era began. Although several named passenger trains survived through the Amtrak era, many were renamed or combined with other services.

SCL would buy out the remaining shares and gain control of the Louisville and Nashville Railroad in 1971, and the Durham and Southern Railway in 1979.

On November 1, 1980, CSX Corporation was created as a holding company for the Family Lines and Chessie System Railroad. Effective January 1, 1983, the Seaboard Coast Line Railroad became Seaboard System Railroad after a merger with the Louisville and Nashville Railroad and Clinchfield Railroad. For some years prior to this, the SCL and L&N had been under the common ownership of a holding company, Seaboard Coast Line Industries (SCLI), the company's railroad subsidiaries being collectively known as the Family Lines System which consisted of the L&N, SCL, Clinchfield and West Point Routes. During this time, the railroads adopted the same paint schemes but continued to operate as separate railroads.

In 1983, CSX combined the Family Lines System units as the Seaboard System Railroad and later CSX Transportation when the former Chessie units merged with the Seaboard in December 1986.

Notable SCL services

Juice Train

Juice Train is the popular name for famous unit trains of Tropicana fresh orange juice operated by railroads in the United States. On June 7, 1970, beginning on Seaboard Coast Line railroad, a mile-long Tropicana Juice Train began carrying one million gallons of juice with one weekly round-trip from Bradenton, Florida to Kearny, New Jersey, in the New York City area. The trip spanned  one way, and the 60 car train was the equivalent of 250 trucks.

Today it is no longer operated by SCL successor CSX Transportation, a victim of CSX’s PSR operating philosophy. In the past, the Juice Trains have been the focus of efficiency studies and awards as examples of how modern rail transportation can compete successfully against trucking and other modes to carry perishable products.

Motive power

Immediately following the 1967 merger, the newly created SCL network had 1,232 locomotives. The vast majority of the ACL roster contained EMD locomotives, while the SAL rostered mainly EMD and Alco diesels in addition to Baldwin models. Both railroads had purchased new freight locomotives in the 5 years leading up to the merger. Among the first new locomotives purchased by the Seaboard Coast Line were 28 GE U33B locomotives, acquired in 1967 and 1968. These were followed by 108 GE U36B locomotives between 1970 and 1972. From EMD, SCL purchased SD45 locomotives in 1968, with more to follow in 1971. SD45-2 locomotives were added in 1974. GP40 and GP40-2 locomotives were added to the fleet between 1968 and 1972 for use on through freights and other high priority freight trains. All former SAL locomotives ran for many years in the "Split-image" scheme, still in full SAL paint, but relettered and renumbered SCL. Two GP-7's 915 & 981 went from pure SAL to SCL Black without being in split-image and GP-7 944 and RS-3 1156 were never painted black, and retained their SAL paint until retired in 1976. The last operating SCL locomotive in SAL paint was GP-40 1559, former SAL 644, and was repainted at Hamlet, NC in March 1976 according to records. There were former P&N locomotives that retained their P&N scheme from 1969 until 1977, only RS-3's 1250 & 1256 and S-4 230 ever were repainted SCL black.

Gainesville Midland SD-40, retained its SAL paint until 1986 when it was repainted Seaboard System 8300, it had been SBD 0010 and 8300 in SAL style "split-image" for several years prior to that.

SCL supplemented its local freight units with orders of GE U18B and EMD GP38-2 locomotives. Some U18B models contained a shorter, and therefore lighter, fuel tank which proved ideal for light density lines. Most units of this type were assigned to the Carolinas. However, in 1978 the SCL decided not to purchase any more locomotives for local service on secondary mainlines and branchlines, instead aging GP7, GP9, and GP18 locomotives would be rebuilt into GP16 models at the Uceta shops.

In the years leading up to the creation of the Seaboard System in 1983, SCL began acquiring the next generation of locomotives from EMD and GE. These orders included GE B23-7 locomotives in 1978 and 1980, including the GE BQ23-7 variant, of which only 10 were built and all belonged to SCL. EMD GP38-2 units were added in 1979 and 1980, and 5 EMD GP40-2 locomotives also delivered in 1980. Six axle GE C30-7 and EMD SD40-2 units were added to the roster between 1979 and 1980.

See also

 Amtrak
 Auto Train
 GP16
 Juice Train

References

External links
Atlantic Coast Line & Seaboard Air Line Railroads Historical Society

 
Seaboard System Railroad
Predecessors of CSX Transportation
Defunct Florida railroads
Defunct Georgia (U.S. state) railroads
Defunct North Carolina railroads
Defunct South Carolina railroads
Defunct Virginia railroads
Former Class I railroads in the United States
Companies based in Jacksonville, Florida
Companies based in Richmond, Virginia
Railway companies established in 1967
Railway companies disestablished in 1983
Defunct Alabama railroads
1967 establishments in the United States